James or Jim Peters may refer to:

 Jimmy Peters (rugby) (1879–1954), English rugby player
 Jack Peters (James Peters), English football player
 James A. Peters (1922–1972), American zoologist
 James L. Peters (1889–1952), American ornithologist
 Jim Peters (politician) (born 1937), New Zealand politician 
 Jim Peters (athlete) (1918–1999), English long-distance runner
 Jimmy Peters Sr. (1922–2006), Canadian ice hockey player 
 Jimmy Peters Jr. (born 1944), Canadian ice hockey player